The Monkees: The Day-by-Day Story of the 60s TV Pop Sensation is a book covering the history of the made-for-TV rock band, The Monkees. Written by Andrew Sandoval, it fully details the band's recording sessions, filming dates and public appearances from 1965-1970. Also included is an extensive listing of session musicians who worked on The Monkees' recordings.

References

External links
Official website

The Monkees
2005 non-fiction books
American biographies
Books about pop music